Austria competed at the 1992 Winter Olympics in Albertville, France.

Competitors
The following is the list of number of competitors in the Games.

Medalists

Alpine skiing

Men

Men's combined

Women

Women's combined

Biathlon

Men

Men's 4 x 7.5 km relay

 1 A penalty loop of 150 metres had to be skied per missed target.
 2 One minute added per missed target.

Bobsleigh

Cross-country skiing

Men

 1 Starting delay based on 10 km results. 
 C = Classical style, F = Freestyle

Men's 4 × 10 km relay

Figure skating

Men

Luge

Men

(Men's) Doubles

Women

Nordic combined 

Men's individual

Events:
 normal hill ski jumping 
 15 km cross-country skiing 

Men's Team

Three participants per team.

Events:
 normal hill ski jumping 
 10 km cross-country skiing

Ski jumping 

Men's team large hill

 1 Four teams members performed two jumps each. The best three were counted.

Speed skating

Men

Women

References

Official Olympic Reports
International Olympic Committee results database
 Olympic Winter Games 1992, full results by sports-reference.com

Nations at the 1992 Winter Olympics
1992
Winter Olympics